James Augustus McDonald  (August 6, 1860 – September 14, 1914), was a Major League Baseball player who was a third baseman. He played in three separate major leagues in 1884–1885, the Union Association, American Association and the National League. He also spent a large amount of time (1878–1883, 1888–1894) playing on minor league teams on the west coast, particularly in the California League.

External links

1860 births
1914 deaths
Major League Baseball third basemen
Pittsburgh Alleghenys players
Washington Nationals (UA) players
Buffalo Bisons (NL) players
19th-century baseball players
San Francisco Californias players
San Francisco Star players
San Francisco Athletics players
San Francisco Nationals players
Oswego Sweegs players
Toledo Avengers players
Milwaukee Brewers (minor league) players
Oakland Greenhood & Morans players
Oakland Colonels players
Sacramento Senators players
Sacramento Gilt Edges players
Seattle Reds players
Seattle Hustlers players